"Fawn Story" is a 1975 episode of the American television anthology series ABC Afterschool Special, directed by Larry Elikann.

Plot
Farmer John McPhail allows his children Jenna and Toby to nurse a wounded deer. They plan on releasing the animal after it is healed. However, something unexpected happens and it even attracts attention from the media.

Cast 
 Kristy McNichol - Jenna McPhail
 Poindexter Yothers - Toby McPhail
 Med Flory - John McPhail
 Karen Obediear - Louisa McPhail
 Gordon Jump - Trooper

External links
 

1975 American television episodes
ABC Afterschool Special episodes